Ron Hunt (born 1941) is a former Major League Baseball player.

Ron Hunt may also refer to:

Ron Hunt (footballer, born 1933) (1933–1999), English footballer (Colchester United)
Ron Hunt (footballer, born 1945) (1945–2018), English footballer (QPR)